Siki Cove is a cove, south of the Song River, north of Arndt Point and east of the village of Katika in Morobe Province, Papua New Guinea. Siki Creek flows into the cove.

Bays of Papua New Guinea
Morobe Province